Lika Osipova (Russian: Лика Осипова) is a TV personality and actress. She is based in Los Angeles, California.

Life and career
Lika was born in 1975 in Pyatigorsk, Stavropol Krai. She started modeling at the age of 13. She graduated with a master's degree in linguistics and philology.

Lika is the founder and producer of the Miss Russian Los Angeles and Miss Russian United States beauty and talent show. In 2012, She received the Role Model of the Year award from the Russian Advisory Board and special Achievement Award from city of West Hollywood. In 2021, She began her singing career with her debut songLights, for which she won Special Jury Award at the Los Angeles Film Awards.

Filmography

Discography
 2021 : Lights
 2022 : YOU AND ME
 2022 : Dolce Vita with my bae

References

External links
 
 

Living people
Russian female models
Russian film actresses
21st-century Russian actresses
Year of birth missing (living people)